Guillaume Couillard and Thomas Oger successfully defended their title by defeating Ugo Nastasi and Mike Scheidweiler 6–4, 7–6 in the final.

Draw

Draw

References
 Main Draw

Men's Doubles